Galium catalinense is a species of flowering plant in the coffee family known by the common name Santa Catalina Island bedstraw. It is endemic to two of the Channel Islands of California, where it grows along the coastal bluffs. It is a shrub growing erect to about a meter in maximum height with a rigid stem lined with whorls of four leaves each. The hairy leaves are generally lance-shaped and one to 2.5 centimeters long. The inflorescence emerging from leaf axils is a dense cluster of whitish flowers.

Subspecies
Two subspecies are currently recognized (May 2014):

Galium catalinense subsp. acrispum Dempster - San Clemente Island
Galium catalinense subsp. catalinense - Santa Catalina Island

References

External links

Jepson Manual Treatment
USDA Plants Profile
Photo gallery

catalinense
Endemic flora of California
Natural history of the California chaparral and woodlands
Natural history of the Channel Islands of California
Flora without expected TNC conservation status